is a railway station on the Ōmura Line in Haenosaki-chō, Sasebo, Nagasaki Prefecture, Japan. It is operated by JR Kyushu and is on the Ōmura Line.

This station serves the Huis Ten Bosch theme park after which it is named.

Lines
Besides the local services on the line, the Rapid Seaside Liner also stops at the station.

Station layout 
The station consists of an island platform serving two tracks. The station building is built of brick in a Dutch style to blend with the theme park and is a hashigami structure, built over the platforms and tracks and houses a ticket counter, a waiting area and a shop. A flight of steps and an elevator from the station concourse gives access to the platform below. Platform/track 2 is a through-track and is used by Ōmura Line traffic. Platform/line 1 was also formerly a through-track but has now become a dead-end siding in order to accommodate the installation of an elevator shaft. It is used for trains such as the Huis Ten Bosch limited express which terminates at the station.

Management of the station has been outsourced to the JR Kyushu Tetsudou Eigyou Co., a wholly owned subsidiary of JR Kyushu specialising in station services. It staffs the ticket counter which is equipped with a Midori no Madoguchi facility.

Adjacent stations

History
JR Kyushu opened the station on 10 March 1992 shortly before the opening of the theme park.

Passenger statistics
In fiscal 2016, the station was used by an average of 1,638 passengers daily (boarding passengers only), and it ranked 110th  among the busiest stations of JR Kyushu.

Surrounding area
Huis Ten Bosch (theme park)
Nagasaki International University
WINS Sasebo

See also
 List of railway stations in Japan

References

External links
Huis Ten Bosch Station (JR Kyushu)

Railway stations in Japan opened in 1992
Railway stations in Nagasaki Prefecture
Stations of Kyushu Railway Company
Sasebo